Abu Shuayb Ayub Ibn Said Erredad al-Sanhaji Assariya (French transliteration Abou Chouaib) (died 1176–7) is the patron saint of Azemmour, Morocco. His mausoleum in Azemmour was built on the order of Mohammed ben Abdallah. It stands on the remains of a Roman building. Abu Shuayb lived in the time of the Almohad and Almoravid dynasties. He was a student of Abu Abdallah Mohammed Amghar and teacher of Abu Yazza, who in his turn was teacher of Abu Madyan. His brotherhood is called the Shuaybiya.

In Azemmour is also the mausoleum of Laila Aisha Bahria, Abu Shuayb's pupil, who travelled from Baghdad to visit him. She died in Azemmour.

References

1176 deaths
12th-century Berber people
Moroccan Sufis
People from the Almohad Caliphate
Sanhaja
Year of birth unknown